WEDM (91.1 FM) is a high school radio station broadcasting from the Walker Career Center at Warren Central High School in Indianapolis, Indiana, United States. The station is currently owned by the Metropolitan School District of Warren Township. WEDM (Branded as "ED91") is operated by its students with faculty supervision. When students are on spring or summer break the station is operated by the faculty. The format of the station is Variety, mainly Pop rock and country.

History
WEDM was one of the first high school radio stations in Marion County.

External links
 
 

High school radio stations in the United States
EDM
Radio stations established in 1980